Kausea Natano (born 5 July 1957) is a Tuvaluan politician who is serving as Prime Minister of Tuvalu, in office since 19 September 2019. He is also serving as an MP for Funafuti, having also served as the country's deputy prime minister and minister for communications in former prime minister Willy Telavi's Cabinet.

Early life 
Before entering politics, Natano was director of customs of Tuvalu, and also served as assistant secretary in the ministry of finance and economic planning.

Political career

Member of Parliament 
Natano was first elected to the Parliament of Tuvalu in 2002.

Before the 2006 election, Natano had been a member of the opposition, but with the changes in the parliament's membership, he had hopes of forming a new coalition of supporters.

Natano was one of seven members re-elected in the 2006 election, in which he received 340 votes. 
Natano was appointed as the Minister for Public Utilities and Industries in Prime Minister Apisai Ielemia's Cabinet.

Natano was re-elected in the 2015 general election and again in the 2019 general election.

Deputy Prime Minister (2010–2013) 
Natano was re-elected to Parliament in the 2010 general election. He then stood for the premiership, and received seven votes from MPs, thus being narrowly defeated by Maatia Toafa, who received eight. In December 2010, Toafa's government was ousted in a motion of no confidence, and Willy Telavi succeeded to the premiership. Natano was among those who supported Telavi, enabling his accession. Upon appointing his Cabinet on December 24, Telavi appointed Natano as Minister for Communications. He was also appointed Deputy Prime Minister.

Following Prime Minister Telavi's removal by Governor General Sir Iakoba Italeli on 1 August 2013 in the context of a political crisis (Telavi had sought to govern without the support of Parliament), Natano and the rest of Cabinet were voted out of office a day later by Parliament, where the opposition now had a clear majority.

Premiership (2019–present) 

Following the 2019 Tuvaluan general election, on 19 September 2019, the members of parliament elected Natano as prime minister with a 10–6 majority.

Personal life 
He is married to Selepa Kausea Natano.

References

See also
 Politics of Tuvalu
 2010 Tuvaluan general election
 Natano Ministry

Living people
Deputy Prime Ministers of Tuvalu
Prime Ministers of Tuvalu
Members of the Parliament of Tuvalu
People from Funafuti
University of the South Pacific alumni
1957 births